The 2018 Lambeth London Borough Council election took place on 3 May 2018 alongside other local elections in London, to elect members of Lambeth London Borough Council in England. The election saw Labour remain in control of Lambeth Council with a slightly reduced majority, winning over 90% of the seats. The Green Party achieved its best-ever result in the borough, winning five seats and becoming the official opposition and the largest Green group in London.

The Green Party finished the runner up in nine of the wards, the Conservatives and Liberal Democrats in five wards and Labour in two.

Overall Results

|}

Council composition
The election saw Labour remain in control of Lambeth Council with a majority reduced by two seats. The party were wiped out in the St Leonard's ward, and they also lost a councillor in both Gipsy Hill and Herne Hill wards.

For the first time since the creation of the council, the Greens became the official opposition with five councillors, including Jonathan Bartley, who is the co-leader of the Green Party.

The Conservatives were reduced down to a single seat in Clapham Common, after Labour gained two of the seats they had previously held, despite the Conservative vote share in the ward increasing. The Conservatives failed to gain their target wards of Thurlow Park, Clapham Town and Larkhall.

The Liberal Democrats failed to make any gains at the election. However, they did comes second to Labour in their target wards.

Rachel Heywood, a former Labour councillor in Coldharbour sought re-election as an independent candidate. Heywood failed to win the seat and finished in 6th place, behind both Green Party candidates but ahead of the Conservatives and Liberal Democrats.

The Women's Equality Party received 8% of the vote in the Brixton Hill ward, finishing in 5th place, ahead of two of the Green Party candidates, the Conservatives and Liberal Democrats. The party also stood candidates in the wards of Prince's and Ferndale.

UKIP saw their vote share largely decrease in the wards they stood in.

The Federalist Party polled 0.2% of the vote in the Prince's ward with the Pirate Party polling 0.2% in the ward of Vassall.

Council composition following the election in May 2018:

Proportionality 
The disproportionality of the 2018 election was 31.00 using the Gallagher Index.

Results by ward 
Candidates shown below are confirmed candidates. An asterisk * indicates an incumbent Councillor seeking re-election.

Bishop's 

 -->

Brixton Hill

Clapham Common

Clapham Town

Coldharbour 

 

On 29 July 2018, Cllr Parr died; this subsequently triggered a by-election on 13 September 2018.

Ferndale

Gipsy Hill

Herne Hill

Knight's Hill

Larkhall

Oval

Prince's

St Leonard's

Stockwell

Streatham Hill

Streatham South

Streatham Wells

Thornton 
 

 

Jane Edbrooke was previously an Oval ward councillor (2010-2018).

Thurlow Park

Tulse Hill 

  

 

 

 

Ben Kind was previously a Bishop's ward councillor (2014-2018).

Vassall

By-elections 2018-2022

 

The by-election was caused by the death of Matthew Parr. 

The by-election was caused by the resignation of Jane Edbrooke.

The by-election was caused by Lib Peck who resigned as Leader of Lambeth Council and as a councillor.

Notes

References

2018
2018 London Borough council elections
21st century in the London Borough of Lambeth